Roderick P. Cameron (born 1939) is an English former professional footballer who played as a full back.

Career
Born in Newcastle, Cameron played for Newcastle West End, Bradford City and Gateshead. For Bradford City, he made 1 appearance in the Football League.

Sources

References

1939 births
Living people
English footballers
Bradford City A.F.C. players
Gateshead F.C. players
English Football League players
Association football fullbacks